Jack Taylor may refer to:

Entertainment
Jack Taylor (American actor) (born 1936), American actor
Jack Taylor (musician) (1965–1997), American musician
Jack Taylor (TV series), an Irish television drama based on novels

Sports

Association football (soccer)
Jack Taylor (footballer, born 1872) (1872–1949), Scottish footballer for Everton FC and Scotland
Jack Taylor (footballer, born 1914) (1914–1978), English footballer and football manager
Jack Taylor (footballer, born 1924) (1924–1970), English footballer
Jack Taylor (referee) (1930–2012), English football referee for the 1974 World Cup Final
Jack Taylor (footballer, born 1998), English/Irish footballer

Water sports
Jack Taylor (British swimmer) (1884–1913), British swimmer
Jack Taylor (rower) (1928–2016), Canadian rower
Jack Taylor (American swimmer) (1931–1955), American swimmer

Other sports
Jack Taylor (1890s pitcher) (1873–1900), American baseball player
Jack Taylor (1900s pitcher) (1874–1938), American baseball player with the Chicago Cubs
Jack Taylor (rugby union, born 1877) (1877–1951), English rugby union footballer for West Hartlepool and England
Jack Taylor (Canadian wrestler) (1887–1956), Canadian wrestler
Jack Taylor (golfer) (1897–1971), English professional golfer
Jack Taylor (rugby union, born 1913) (1913–1979), New Zealand rugby union footballer, coach and administrator
Jack Taylor (Australian footballer) (born 1924), Australian rules footballer
Jack Taylor (British wrestler) (born 1932), British Olympic wrestler
Jack Taylor (skier) (1948–2008), American freestyle skier
Jack Taylor (basketball) (born 1990), American basketball player, record holder for highest single-game point total in NCAA men's basketball history
Jack Taylor (cricketer) (born 1991), English cricketer

Other
Jack Taylor (Arizona politician) (1907–1995), American politician, mayor of Mesa, Arizona, and state legislator
Jack Hendrick Taylor (1909–1959), United States Navy and OSS officer and Nazi concentration camp survivor
Jack C. Taylor (1922–2016), American businessman, founder of Enterprise Rent-a-Car
Jack Taylor (journalist) (born 1928), American television and radio presenter
Jack Taylor (Colorado politician) (1935–2020), American politician in Colorado
Jack Taylor (heavyweight man) (1946–2006), fattest man in Great Britain

See also
John Taylor (disambiguation)

Taylor, Jack